Max Barry (born 18 March 1973) is an Australian author. He also maintains a blog on various topics, including politics. When he published his first novel, Syrup, he spelled his name "Maxx", but subsequently has used "Max".

Barry is also the creator of NationStates, an online game created to help advertise Jennifer Government that eventually evolved into its own online community.  He is the owner of the website "Tales of Corporate Oppression". He lives in Melbourne with his wife and daughters and worked as a marketer for Hewlett-Packard before he became a novelist.

In early 2004 Barry converted his web site to a blog and began regularly posting to it. In the November 2004 issue of the magazine Fast Company the novel Company was ranked at number 8 on a list of the top 100 "people, ideas, and trends that will change how we work and live in 2005". Barry wrote the screenplay for Syrup, which was released in theatres on 7 June 2013. Universal Pictures has acquired screen rights to Company, which will be adapted by Steve Pink. Jennifer Government was optioned by Steven Soderbergh and George Clooney's now defunct Section Eight Productions. His book, Machine Man, initially was an online serial, but has since been updated and published in 2011 by Vintage Books. The film rights have been picked up by Mandalay Pictures.

Bibliography

Novels
 Syrup (1999), 
 Jennifer Government (2003), 
 Company (2006), 
 Machine Man (2011), 
 Lexicon (2013), 
 Providence (2020), 
 The 22 Murders of Madison May (2021), 
 Discordia (2021) (audio only)

Short stories
 "Attack of the Supermodels" (2001)
 "A Shade Less Perfect" (2005)
 "Springtide" (2007)
 "How I Met My Daughter" (2007)
 "I Should Buy Some Cement" (2008)
 "It Came From Cruden Farm" (2020)

Essays
 "Succeeding In Business Through Marketing Fads" (2000)
 "Things Critics Do That Piss Me Off" (2002)
 "Why Copyright Is Doomed" (2002)
 "Australia gets closer" (2014)

References

External links

Max Barry | Why I Hate Windows (this time)
Max Barry's official site
NationStates game
Tales of Corporate Oppression
Extensive interview of Max Barry, "To Finish Writing A Novel, You Need To Be Delusional"
NYT Review of Company
Max's Short Stories and Essays.

1973 births
Living people
20th-century Australian novelists
21st-century Australian novelists
Australian bloggers
Australian male novelists
Australian satirists
Australian science fiction writers
Australian male short story writers
Writers from Melbourne
20th-century Australian short story writers
21st-century Australian short story writers
20th-century Australian male writers
21st-century Australian male writers
Male bloggers